Peter Coghlan (born 27 March 1975 in Dublin) is a retired Irish track and field athlete who specialised in the 110 metres hurdles event. He represented his country at the 2000 Summer Olympics in Sydney, as well as five outdoor and two indoor World Championships.

His personal bests of 13.30 for the 110 metres hurdles and 7.57 for the 60 metres hurdles, both from 1999, are current national records.

He attended Belvedere College secondary school in Dublin at the same time as fellow Olympian Cian O'Connor.

Competition record

References

1975 births
Living people
Irish male hurdlers
Olympic athletes of Ireland
Athletes (track and field) at the 2000 Summer Olympics
Sportspeople from Dublin (city)
World Athletics Championships athletes for Ireland
People educated at Belvedere College